Jock Taylor (9 March 1954 – 15 August 1982) was a Scottish World Champion motorcycle sidecar racer.

John Robert (Jock) Taylor was born in Pencaitland, East Lothian, and entered his first sidecar race at the age of 19, as the passenger to Kenny Andrews (1974). The following year he took part in his first race as a driver. Taylor died in Finland as a consequence of a racing incident in 1982.

Racing career
Taylor was the Scottish Sidecar Champion with passenger Lewis Ward in 1977. He won races at East Fortune near Haddington, Beveridge Park in Kirkcaldy and at Knockhill near Dunfermline as well events in England with some success. In 1978 he decided to tackle the odd Grand Prix race and the British Championships and parted company with Ward and teamed up with a new passenger from nearby Haddington called Jimmy Neil. It took some time for the new partnership to gel but by the end of the season they were regularly winning races in England. In 1979 Taylor acquired a Seymaz hub steering type outfit and found it not to his liking after two accidents that left Jimmy Neil with a fractured wrist and caused the death of stand-in passenger Dave Powell at Oulton Park in a high-speed crash. With Neil still injured, Taylor used veteran passenger Jimmy Law for the German GP at Hockenheim on his old Windle framed Yamaha where they finished fifth. Although Neil returned at Assen in Holland, it was when he teamed up with former Swedish 125 cc rider Benga Johansson that Taylor took his first Grand Prix victory at the Swedish TT at Karlskoga shortly after. There were further successes towards the end of 1979 in Britain where he finished runner-up in the British Championship behind Dick Greasley. In 1980, Taylor and Benga Johansson won 4 Grand Prix races, and finished on the podium in all seven events they finished. He won the British Championship and won the Isle of Man Sidecar B race to win the Sidecar TT overall. In 1981 he retained his British title and he went on to become a four-time TT race winner. In 1982 Taylor and Johansson raised the sidecar lap record at the Isle of Man TT to 108.29 mph (ca. 175 km/h), a lap record which stood for 7 years.

Death
In the 1982 Finnish Grand Prix, held in Imatra under very wet conditions, Taylor and Johansson's bike aquaplane and slid off the road and collided with a telephone pole along the closed public road course that was used once a year for the Finnish GP. The emergency services were removing him from the wreckage when a second sidecar team slid off into them. Taylor was sadly killed in the second accident. He was buried in the local cemetery at Pencaitland, and a memorial to him has been erected in the village in December 2006. A memorial also stands in Beveridge Park, Kirkcaldy, overlooking Railway Bend on the old motorcycle racing circuit. Jock Taylor has also a memorial in Imatra, near the paddock of Finnish championship racetrack.

Restoration

Jock's World championship, and TT 108.29 mph lap record-winning sidecar was bought by friend and fellow competitor Jack Muldoon from Jock's sponsor Dennis Trollope. Jack rescued Jock's outfit from the 5-man consortium who were supposed to restore the bike to its original condition and display it in a museum in Alford, Aberdeenshire. That never happened in the four years that it lay up in Alford in bits in a shed.

Jack Muldoon and family bought Jock's bike in March 2012 and started the restoration work immediately. The sidecar was completely stripped to a bare chassis, with months spent with emery cleaning and polishing the chassis. Due to the 26 years it lay at Donington in the museum and then 4 years up in Aberdeen, the chassis and all components were covered in rust and everything was seized: every component on the bike had to be stripped and cleaned, all bearings in all parts of the chassis were replaced, and the engine was completely rebuilt. It was done with the help of Bill Howarth and Dennis Trollope for all the Yamaha TZ700 parts required in the engine rebuild; Terry Windle, Stuart Mellor, Lockheed, HEL Performance Brake Pipes, Paul Drake Koni Shockers, Yolst Silkoline Oils. By August the restoration was 90% complete – it was the first time in 30 years that the TZ700 engine had run, and it was paraded at the Jock Taylor Memorial race weekend at East Fortune near Edinburgh in August 2012, a few miles from where Jock was born and brought up.

Annual Jock Taylor Memorial Race
In the year following his death an annual end of season race was established at Knockhill called the Jock Taylor Trophy and it has always attracted the very best crews. Every year sidecar racers travel from all over the UK to race in what has become a prestigious race. In 2012, the race was held at East Fortune where Taylor started his racing career nearly 40 years ago.

References

External links
 Taylor's Rider Profile on the official Isle of Man TT website
 BBC News article on unveiling of memorial, December 2006

1954 births
1982 deaths
Sportspeople from East Lothian
Motorcycle racers who died while racing
Scottish motorcycle racers
Sport deaths in Finland
Sidecar racers
People from Pencaitland